Ceramide glucosyltransferase is an enzyme that in humans is encoded by the UGCG gene.

Glycosphingolipids (GSLs) are a group of membrane components that contain lipid and sugar moieties. They are present in essentially all animal cells and are believed to have important roles in various cellular processes.  UDP-glucose ceramide glucosyltransferase catalyzes the first glycosylation step in glycosphingolipid biosynthesis.  The product, glucosylceramide, is the core structure of more than 300 GSLs. UGCG is widely expressed and transcription is upregulated during keratinocyte differentiation.

Interactions
UGCG has been shown to interact with RTN1.

References

Further reading